Belford is an unincorporated community and census-designated place (CDP) located within Middletown Township, in Monmouth County, New Jersey, United States. As of the 2010 United States Census, the CDP's population was 1,768.

Geography
According to the United States Census Bureau, the CDP had a total area of 1.313 square miles (3.401 km2), including 1.279 square miles (3.313 km2) of land and 0.034 square miles (0.088 km2) of water (2.60%).

Demographics

Census 2010

Census 2000
As of the 2000 United States Census there were 1,340 people, 436 households, and 374 families living in the CDP. The population density was 1,058.9 people per square mile (407.4/km2). There were 458 housing units at an average density of 361.9/sq mi (139.2/km2). The racial makeup of the CDP was 97.16% White, 0.22% African American, 0.07% Native American, 0.67% Asian, 1.12% from other races, and 0.75% from two or more races. Hispanic or Latino of any race were 4.70% of the population.

There were 436 households, out of which 42.0% had children under the age of 18 living with them, 69.5% were married couples living together, 11.7% had a female householder with no husband present, and 14.2% were non-families. 10.1% of all households were made up of individuals, and 3.7% had someone living alone who was 65 years of age or older. The average household size was 3.06 and the average family size was 3.29.

In the CDP the population was spread out, with 27.2% under the age of 18, 6.8% from 18 to 24, 34.4% from 25 to 44, 22.8% from 45 to 64, and 8.9% who were 65 years of age or older. The median age was 36 years. For every 100 females, there were 98.2 males. For every 100 females age 18 and over, there were 95.6 males.

The median income for a household in the CDP was $66,964, and the median income for a family was $70,583. Males had a median income of $51,830 versus $35,052 for females. The per capita income for the CDP was $25,412. About 1.3% of families and 3.2% of the population were below the poverty line, including 1.9% of those under age 18 and 6.1% of those age 65 or over.

Transportation
The ferry slip at Belford is SeaStreak's Raritan Bayshore terminal with service to Pier 11 at Wall Street, the Battery Park City Ferry Terminal, and West Midtown Ferry Terminal in New York City. Boats travel across the Lower New York Bay and enter the harbor at The Narrows for a trip that takes approximately 50 minutes. In 2011, $2.5 million in state funding was awarded to improve the bulkhead at the facility. In 2023, New Jersey got $11.3 million from the federal government for hybrid-powered ferries for NY Waterway and upgrading the Belford Ferry Terminal. Out of the $11.3 Million, $4 million will be used to make repairs, and updates to the Belford Ferry Terminal.

New Jersey Transit offers local bus service on the 817 and 834 routes.

Notable people

People who were born in, residents of, or otherwise closely associated with Belford include:
 Knowshon Moreno, running back for the Denver Broncos and Miami Dolphins.
 Tammy Lynn Sytch, professional wrestling manager best known for her time in the World Wrestling Federation as the character, Sunny.
 Claudia Vázquez (born 1990), footballer who has played as forward and midfielder for the Puerto Rico women's national football team.

References

Census-designated places in Monmouth County, New Jersey
Middletown Township, New Jersey
Raritan Bayshore